Lester Barber Stevens (born February 28, 1884, Milwaukee, Wisconsin; died January 1972, Waukesha, Wisconsin) was an American athlete.  He competed at the 1908 Summer Olympics in London. In the 100 meters, Stevens won his first round heat with a time of 11.2 seconds to advance to the semifinals.  There, he placed fourth in his race and did not advance to the final.

References

Sources
 
 
 

1884 births
1972 deaths
Athletes (track and field) at the 1908 Summer Olympics
Olympic track and field athletes of the United States
American male sprinters